Fontana is an urban neighborhood of Belgrade, the capital of Serbia. It is located in the municipality of New Belgrade.

Location 

Fontana sprawls around the intersection of Pariske Komune, Narodnih heroja and Otona Župančiča streets, in the north-central section of the municipality.  In the north, it extends into the neighborhood of Paviljoni, and in the west into Tošin Bunar. The local community of Fontana, sub-municipal administrative unit, covers a square shaped area bounded by the streets Pariske Komune and Bulevar Mihajla Pupina on the north, Bulevar Umetnosti on the east, Bulevar Arsenija Čarnojevića on the south and Narodnih heroja on the west. It occupies the blocks No. 1 (where the Fontana Complex itself is situated), 31, 32 and 33.

Population 

Local communities of Fontana (formerly "25th May") and Zapadna Kapija (formerly "Sutjeska") were merged into one local community named Fontana for the 2011 census. According to the censuses, the population of local communities Fontana and Zapadna Kapija was 5,519 and 5,067 in 1981, 5,237 and 5,187 in 1991 and 4,476 and 4,278 in 2002, respectively. Unified Fontana had a population of 7,849 in 2011.

History 

When the plans were made for New Belgrade, the territory was divided in blocks, each one with assigned number. The first blocks, 1 and 2, became core of the future Fontana. They were designed by architect Branko Petričić (1911-1984). He worked with Le Corbusier and accepted his idea of Ville Radieuse, which he applied in the Fontana's design. He also used the "Žeželj method" of construction for the first time. Devised by engineer , it incorporated construction with the prefabricated modular elements made of reinforced concrete.

In March 2008, city government announced complete reconstruction of Block 1, including the old shopping complex "Fontana", which at the time of construction was unofficial center of Novi Beograd. Reconstruction should be finished by the end of 2008, and it should include building of a public underground garage, renovation of the children playgrounds, green areas, fountain and ground level of "Fontana" center. Originally, city planned to build overground garage, but after the protests of the local population, idea was changed. As for the "Fontana" center itself, it will be reconstructed under the supervision of the Institute for the protection of cultural monuments, because complex is considered to be a representative of the modern Serbian architecture.

However, the reconstruction began only in September 2010 and the phase I was finished by May 2011. In phase II, the cinema was restored and opened on 8 March 2012 with the Festival of Francophone films.

Characteristics 

Apart from being a residential area, some commercial and educational facilities are located nearby, the most prominent being a multifunctional shopping and cultural center "Fontana" by architect Uroš Martinović (1918-2004). Finished in 1968, it was considered an "architectural wonder" at the time. It contained a popular cinema "Fontana", which was closed in 1991.

In the neighborhood there are also a McDonald's restaurant, indoor arena Ranko Žeravica Sports Hall with an outdoor stadium, four kindergartens, three elementary schools (school "Duško Radović", established in 1961), and two high schools (Graphic Design Secondary School and IX Belgrade Gymnasium). Fontana is well-connected to the other parts of Belgrade as over ten lines of public transportation pass through the neighborhood.

One of the tallest buildings in Belgrade, the Western City Gate, is located within the local community, southwest of the Fontana itself, at the corner of the Narodnih Heroja Street and the Boulevard of Arsenije Čarnojević. In September 2021, it was announced that another skyscraper will be built in the opposite corner of the local community. A station of the future Belgrade Metro is also planned on this location.

In August 2021 it was announced that city's Institute for the Cultural Monuments' Protection is conducting a study on protecting Blocks 1 and 2 as the spatial cultural-historical unit.

Main features in local community's blocks include:

Protection 
The original Fontana Complex, located at 13 Pariske Komune street, has been placed under the preliminary state protection, as the prospective cultural monument.

The entire area of Block 1, with the adjoining Block 2 to the north, has also been placed under the preliminary protection as the Spatial Cultural-Historical Unit

References  

Neighborhoods of Belgrade
New Belgrade